The 2010 Lebanese Elite Cup is the 13th edition of this football tournament in Lebanon. It will be held from August to September 2010. This tournament includes the six best teams from the 2009–10 Lebanese Premier League season.

Groups

Group A

Group B

Final stage

Semifinals

Final

References

Lebanese Elite Cup seasons
Elite